Kantner is a German locational surname, which originally meant a person from places called named Kanten in Prussia or Silesia. Alternatively, Kanter can be an occupational surname for a maker of wooden racks or trestles for alcohol barrels, derived from the Middle High German kanter ("barrel rack"). The name may refer to:

China Kantner (born 1971), American actress
Harold D. Kantner (1886–1973), American aviator
Konrad V Kantner (1385–1439), Polish duke
Paul Kantner (1941–2016), American musician
Seth Kantner (born 1965), American writer

See also
Cantner, surname

References

German-language surnames